Kopparvallen is a multi-use stadium in Åtvidaberg, Sweden.  It is used mostly for football matches and is the home stadium of Åtvidabergs FF. The stadium holds 8,000 people and was built in 1907. Famous football players who have played in the arena is Ralf Edström, Roland Sandberg, Conny Torstensson, Ilie Balaci, Zlatan Ibrahimović and Pelé.

References

Åtvidabergs FF
Football venues in Sweden
Sports venues completed in 1920
1920 establishments in Sweden